The Grasshopper is the name of multiple humorous fictional superheroes appearing in American comic books published by Marvel Comics, all created by Dan Slott. No Grasshopper to date has survived past the issue in which they first appeared. The Grasshoppers are a simultaneous homage to and satire of stereotypical superheroes and Marvel's tendency towards animal-themed characters.  They are also a lampoon of the tendency of superhero team books to introduce new, hastily developed characters only to dramatically kill them off within a few issues. The complicated romantic troubles of the first Grasshopper recall many characters with similar subplots (Spider-Man, for instance), as does the unlikely family background of the second.

Doug Taggert

Grasshopper is a fictional superhero in the Marvel Comics universe who first appeared in the pages of the GLA miniseries of 2005. The character was created by Dan Slott and Paul Pelletier. He was a member of the Great Lakes Avengers for 5.8 seconds.

Fictional character biography
Although first appearing when he joined in a fourth wall breaking out-of-continuity prequel presented by Squirrel Girl, he did not appear in continuity until the next issue.

It is revealed that Grasshopper is in fact Doug Taggert, an employee of Roxxon Oil who pines after fellow Roxxon researcher Cindy Shelton, who in turn only has eyes for the "ever-gregarious Grasshopper" (thus setting up a classic comic-book style love triangle). Later, it is clarified that Grasshopper is "part-time Roxxon security" who does "some super heroing on the side". Though it is never so stated, the implication is that Roxxon designed and built the gear which is the source of Grasshopper's powers. Soon, Grasshopper meets up with the GLA as they both try to stop a robbery being committed by Batroc's Brigade. During the battle, Grasshopper agrees to join up with the GLA and then, almost immediately, is killed by a sai thrown by the supervillain Zaran after it passed through teammate Doorman. As team sidekick Monkey Joe comments off-panel, "Five point eight seconds. A new record for shortest membership on ANY team".

Later, Doug Taggert briefly appears in a limbo-like afterlife, playing cards with the other deceased GLA members. Though not particularly cheery in demeanor, he did not seem too upset about his unfortunate fate either.

Powers and abilities
The first Grasshopper's powers are derived entirely from a powered suit, metallic green in color and with an appearance reminiscent of his namesake. The suit's primary ability is that of a fantastic vertical leap, powered by long robotic grasshopper legs. These legs can also deliver devastating kicks. Its secondary abilities include "Insectroid Sensors", which work as an early warning system, and Zoom Lenses, which provide long range sight. Voice activated commands can be used to initiate some of the suit's powers. A notable fault of the suit seems to be that, despite its stiff and sturdy appearance, it offers little to no armor protection to the wearer (thus allowing a simple hand-thrown weapon to pierce the head, normally one of the most heavily defended areas on a suit of armor). It is unknown whether Taggart's suit had the "Maximum Jump" ability his successor Neil Shelton had while using the suit.

Significant Issues
GLA #2
GLA #4

Neil Shelton

The second Grasshopper is a fictional, corporate superhero in the Marvel Comics universe who first appeared in the pages of GLX-Mas Special #1, a Marvel Comics one-shot, in 2005.  The character was created by Dan Slott and artist Ty Templeton, who based his design on Paul Pelletier's design for the original Grasshopper.

It was not made clear if he was a member of the Great Lakes X-Men (as the GLA were called at the time) before he, like Doug Taggart, was killed in action.

Publication history
This Grasshopper is a combined homage to Iron Man and Spider-Man, borrowing many aspects of each's histories. Like Taggart before him, Shelton did not live more than one issue.

Fictional character biography
Neil Shelton was a security guard for Roxxon who gained use of the Grasshopper suit some time after Doug Taggert's death. As the second Grasshopper, he used a powered armor similar to that of Iron Man. The suit's primary ability is that of a fantastic vertical leap, which is powered by robotic grasshopper legs. Its secondary abilities include Insectroid Sensors, which work as an early warning system, and Zoom Lenses, which provide long range sight. Voice activated commands can be used to initiate some of the suit's powers.

While patrolling outside of Roxxon Labs on Christmas Day, Shelton defeated Killer Shrike (himself a former employee of Roxxon) during the villain's attempt to steal "Project Z". Dr. Cindy Shelton shows up to recover the "Project Z" device and, unaware that this is a new wearer of the suit, invites Grasshopper to dinner. Via thought balloon, Neil states that he is secretly Cindy's long lost brother and must deny her feelings. This revelation makes the previous Grasshopper/Cindy Shelton love triangle even more bizarre. To escape Cindy's amorous advances, Neil initiates a "Maximum Jump", rocketing heroically into the air. However, it is later revealed (when Doorman, in his new role as an angel of death, shows up to pick up his spirit) that the jump propelled Grasshopper into space, killing him. His sacrifice was not completely in vain, as Grasshopper's body re-entered the Earth's atmosphere to become a beautiful Christmas shooting star.

Significant Issues
GLX-Mas Special #1

"The All-New Grasshopper"

The third Grasshopper is a fictional superhero in the Marvel Comics universe who first appeared in the pages of the one-shot Deadpool/GLI Summer Fun Spectacular #1 in 2007. He was created by writer Dan Slott and artist Kieron Dwyer, who based his design on Paul Pelletier's design for the original Grasshopper.

Virtually no information was revealed about him other than his status as "The All-New Grasshopper" before a disgruntled Deadpool killed him by snapping his neck after being kicked out of the Great Lakes Initiative. Grasshopper is later shown in Hell when Deadpool and Thanos venture there in search of the missing Death.

Significant issues
Deadpool/GLI Summer Fun Spectacular #1

Skrull imposter

The fourth Grasshopper is a fictional character in the Marvel Comics universe who first appeared in the pages of Avengers: The Initiative #19 in 2008.  He was created by writers Dan Slott and Christos Gage.

This Grasshopper turned out to be a Skrull impostor as part of the Secret Invasion. While Mr. Immortal was shocked to find that he was an imposter, Big Bertha thought it was ridiculously obvious. After the invasion is over, the real Grasshopper is not shown in a support group meeting with the others that had been replaced by Skrulls.

Significant issues
Avengers: The Initiative #19

Fifth Grasshopper

The fifth Grasshopper is a fictional character in the Marvel Comics universe who first appeared in the pages of Fantastic Four Vol. 6 #43 in 2022. He was created by Dan Slott, Rachael Stott and Andrea Di Vito.

Somehow, this Grasshopper ended up joining the Great Lakes Avengers, alongside a returning Squirrel Girl who had initially left after being relied on too much, and was defeated alongside the rest of his teammates against Cormorant. Oddly enough, unlike the previous Grasshoppers, this one actually survives his battle against the sinister alien forces, though he is still badly beaten.

Significant issues
Fantastic Four Vol. 6 #43

References

External links
 Great Lakes Avengers
 MDP: Grasshopper (Doug Taggert) (Marvel Database Project)

Marvel Comics superheroes
Comics characters introduced in 2005
Characters created by Dan Slott
Avengers (comics) characters